Pyotr Petrovich Schilovsky (September 22, 1872 – June 30, 1955 in Herefordshire) was a Russian count, jurist, statesman, and governor of Kostroma from 1910 to 1912 and of Olonets Governorate from 1912 to 1913. He is best known as the inventor of the gyrocar, which was built under his direction by the Wolseley Tool and Motorcar Company beginning in 1912, and was demonstrated for the first time in London in April 1914. In 1922 Schilovsky emigrated to the United Kingdom.

The gyrocar was discovered again in 1938 when workmen uncovered its well preserved remains in the Ward End property of Wolseley. Although it had been buried it was said the chassis was in excellent condition, the engine turned over and the gyros still pivoted, the main issue was damage to the aluminium bodywork. After being excavated it was transferred into the Wolseley Museum.

References 

 The Schilovski Gyrocar
 P.P. Shilovski The gyroscope: its practical construction and application, treating of the physics and experimental mechanics of the gyroscope, and explaining the methods of its application to the stabilization of monorailways, ships, aeroplanes, marine guns, etc., preface by Prof. C. V. Boys, F.R.S. 224 pages, London, E. & F. N. Spon, ltd.; New York, Spon & Chamberlain, 1924 ASIN B0000EFPRK 
 SCHILOVSKY, P., 28, Dulwich Wood Park, London. May 31, 1933, No. 15695. Class 122 (v). Abstract of GB405513 405,513. Stuffing-box substitutes.
 Two-wheel monsters. Part One: Shilovsky's Gyrocar 

Russian jurists
Russian politicians
Russian nobility
Russian inventors
1871 births
1957 deaths